The English Pug and the French Poodle, also known as The Two Snobs, is a privately-owned outdoor 2013 art installation with two bronze sculptures by the Canadian artist Marc André J. Fortier, installed at 500 Place d'Armes in Montreal, Quebec, Canada.

Description
Standing in the heart of Old Montreal, the diptych evokes, with humour, the cultural discords that used to prevail between the French and English Canadians. Inspired by the historical site of the building, the novel Two Solitudes by Hugh MacLennan and Commedia dell'arte, the artist decided to express in his own way, this historical divide. For this, Fortier has intentionally divided the piece into two clear segments to accentuate the distance between the two parties. Both characters stand on the ground and face away from each other on opposite sides of the building. 

On the south side corner of the tower, an Englishman, represented as a thin, elegant, pretentious man, wearing a grid pattern suit with a bow tie, firmly presses against his chest a pug and stares with condescension at the Notre-Dame Basilica, a symbol of the religious dominance of the Catholic Church in Quebec. On the north side corner of the same tower, a Frenchwoman represented as a small, elegant, snooty lady, wearing a Chanel-style suit, rubber-zippered high-heeled shoe covers and an imitation beret, firmly holds against her chest a French Poodle and stares with discontent at the head office of the Bank of Montreal, a symbol of the English power. Both dogs are attracted to each other but are made by their owners to stay away and far apart.

A bronze plate anchored beside each character states the storyline in both languages:

References

External links
 

2013 establishments in Canada
2013 sculptures
Bronze sculptures in Canada
Old Montreal
Outdoor sculptures in Montreal
Sculptures of dogs in Canada
Sculptures of men in Canada
Sculptures of women in Canada
Statues in Canada